Zeeshan Ashraf (born 11 May 1992) is a Pakistani cricketer. He made his first-class debut for Multan in the 2012–13 Quaid-e-Azam Trophy on 13 January 2013. He was the leading run-scorer for Multan in the 2018–19 Quaid-e-Azam One Day Cup, with 370 runs in eight matches. In March 2019, he was named in Balochistan's squad for the 2019 Pakistan Cup.

References

External links
 

1992 births
Living people
Pakistani cricketers
Multan cricketers
Multan Sultans cricketers
Cricketers from Okara, Pakistan
Southern Punjab (Pakistan) cricketers